The Dragon was a sailing event on the Sailing at the 1972 Summer Olympics program in Kiel-Schilksee.  Seven races were scheduled. Only six races were sailed due to weather conditions. 70 sailors, on 23 boats, from 23 nation competed. It was the last Olympic appearance of the Dragon.

Race schedule 
Because of insufficient wind the scheduled race in the Dragon was postponed on 5 September 1972. Due to the interruption of the Games on 6 September 1972, the race was postponed till 7 September. Then the race conditions were unsuitable. Heavy fog and poor wind conditions made it not possible to race until 8 September. Finally for the Dragon only six regattas took place. Also the medal ceremony was also postponed until 8 September.

Course area and course configuration 
For the Dragon course area A (Alpha) was used. The location (54°29'50'’N, 10°22'00'’E) points to the center of the 2 nm radius circle. The distance between mark 1 and 3 was about 2nm.

Final results 
These are the results of the Dragon event.

Daily standings

Further reading

References 

Dragon
Dragon (keelboat) competitions